BlackJack Academy is a 1988 video game published by MicroIllusions.

Gameplay
BlackJack Academy is a game in which the player learns by playing blackjack in a casino environment.

Reception
Roy Wagner reviewed the game for Computer Gaming World, and stated that "This program is a good example of software that can be used for recreational fun, serious study, and possibly financial profit (or loss). The graphics and sound are at a quality level. The user interface is excellent. If you like playing blackjack or want to learn more about the game, this program is for you."

Reviews
ASM (Aktueller Software Markt) - May, 1988

References

External links
Review in Info
Review in Info
Review in Videogame & Computer World (Italian)
Review in Commodore Magazine
Review in Hardcore Computist
Review in Pelit (Finnish)
Review in RUN Magazine

1988 video games
Amiga games
Apple II games
Blackjack video games
Commodore 64 games
DOS games
MicroIllusions games
Westwood Studios games